Epischnia albella is a species of snout moth in the genus Epischnia. It was described by Hans Georg Amsel in 1954, and is known from Egypt the Palestinian territories and the United Arab Emirates.

References

Moths described in 1954
Phycitini